Purerua Peninsula is a peninsula on the northwest side of the Bay of Islands in Northland, New Zealand. Te Puna Inlet lies to the south of the peninsula. Communities on the peninsula are Purerua, Te Tii and Taronui Bay. Rangihoua Bay is at the southern end of the peninsula.

Te Tii has two marae, belonging to the Ngāpuhi hapū of Ngāti Rēhia: Hiruhārama Hou Marae and meeting house, and Whitiora Marae and Te Ranga Tira Tanga meeting house.

Another local marae, Wharengaere, is a meeting place of the Ngāpuhi hapū of Ngāti Mau and Ngāti Torehina.

Demographics

There were 75 households, comprising 105 males and 99 females, giving a sex ratio of 1.06 males per female. The median age was 43.2 years (compared with 37.4 years nationally), with 48 people (23.9%) aged under 15 years, 24 (11.9%) aged 15 to 29, 102 (50.7%) aged 30 to 64, and 27 (13.4%) aged 65 or older.

Ethnicities were 67.2% European/Pākehā, 44.8% Māori, and 1.5% Asian. People may identify with more than one ethnicity.

Although some people chose not to answer the census's question about religious affiliation, 47.8% had no religion, 29.9% were Christian, 11.9% had Māori religious beliefs, 1.5% were Buddhist and 1.5% had other religions.

Of those at least 15 years old, 30 (19.6%) people had a bachelor's or higher degree, and 30 (19.6%) people had no formal qualifications. The median income was $23,700, compared with $31,800 nationally. 24 people (15.7%) earned over $70,000 compared to 17.2% nationally. The employment status of those at least 15 was that 66 (43.1%) people were employed full-time, 27 (17.6%) were part-time, and 12 (7.8%) were unemployed.

Rangitane-Purerua statistical area

Rangitane-Purerua had a population of 1,506 at the 2018 New Zealand census, an increase of 342 people (29.4%) since the 2013 census, and an increase of 324 people (27.4%) since the 2006 census. There were 531 households, comprising 759 males and 747 females, giving a sex ratio of 1.02 males per female. The median age was 47.0 years (compared with 37.4 years nationally), with 303 people (20.1%) aged under 15 years, 180 (12.0%) aged 15 to 29, 741 (49.2%) aged 30 to 64, and 282 (18.7%) aged 65 or older.

Ethnicities were 78.7% European/Pākehā, 30.5% Māori, 2.2% Pacific peoples, 1.2% Asian, and 1.8% other ethnicities. People may identify with more than one ethnicity.

The percentage of people born overseas was 22.9, compared with 27.1% nationally.

Although some people chose not to answer the census's question about religious affiliation, 53.8% had no religion, 28.5% were Christian, 6.6% had Māori religious beliefs, 0.4% were Buddhist and 2.6% had other religions.

Of those at least 15 years old, 237 (19.7%) people had a bachelor's or higher degree, and 192 (16.0%) people had no formal qualifications. The median income was $29,200, compared with $31,800 nationally. 195 people (16.2%) earned over $70,000 compared to 17.2% nationally. The employment status of those at least 15 was that 492 (40.9%) people were employed full-time, 198 (16.5%) were part-time, and 51 (4.2%) were unemployed.

Education
Bay of Islands International Academy is a state-funded Year 1-8 New Zealand primary school which opened in January 2013 in the existing buildings and grounds of the former Te Tii School on the Purerua Peninsula, about 17 km north of Kerikeri township. A Purerua Public School had been in existence since 1906, with a ferry service from Te Tii. The academy's Māori name is Te Whare Mātauranga o Te Tii.

The  academy is an authorised IB World School offering the International Baccalaureate Primary Years Programme. The program emphasises academic achievement, inquiry-style learning and an international, multicultural curriculum. All students are required to learn a second language. The school serves the Kerikeri/Waipapa/Purerua area of New Zealand's Far North District and has capacity for about 100 students. Its role was 117 as of December 2015. An enrolment zone is in effect.

Bay of Islands International Academy is sited on two hectares (five acres) of grounds. Facilities include four classrooms, a library, a resource room, administrative space, a swimming pool, and play areas. The school is connected to the internet via 100Mbit/s fibre optic ultra-fast broadband, and all learning spaces have WiFi coverage. Following the 2013 national census the school shifted from decile 3 to decile 6, indicating a substantial shift in the population of attending students.

Notable people
Glenn Colquhoun, poet

References

External links
 Te Tii School's official website

Far North District
Peninsulas of the Northland Region
Bay of Islands